Geffery Morgan is the fifth album by UB40. Released in 1984, it takes its title inspired by a piece of chalk graffiti on a wall: "Geffery Morgan...loves white girls" taken by the award winning and acclaimed documentary photographer Dr. Vanley Burke . Following the huge success of their covers album, Labour of Love, all tracks on this album are self-penned. The album contained the hit "If It Happens Again", which reached #9 in the UK charts.

Track listing 
All tracks composed and arranged by UB40
"Riddle Me" – 3:57
"As Always You Were Wrong Again" – 3:37
"If It Happens Again" – 3:44
"D.U.B." – 4:52
"The Pillow" – 3:26
"Nkomo-A-Go-Go" – 3:06
"Seasons" – 3:48
"You're Not an Army" – 3:46
"I'm Not Fooled So Easily" – 4:14
"Your Eyes Were Open" – 5:00

Personnel 
UB40
 Ali Campbell – lead vocals and backing vocals, rhythm guitar
 Robin Campbell – lead vocals and backing vocals, lead guitar
 Astro – trumpet and backing vocals
 Brian Travers – saxophone and lyricon 
 Michael Virtue – synthesizers and electric piano
 Earl Falconer – bass
 Norman Hassan – trombone, percussions and backing vocals
 Jim Brown – electronic drums and drum machine

References

1984 albums
UB40 albums